The York Cold War Bunker is a two-storey, semi-subterranean, Cold War bunker in the Holgate area of York, England, built in 1961 to monitor nuclear explosions and fallout in Yorkshire, in the event of nuclear war.

One of about 30 around the United Kingdom, the building was used throughout its operational existence as the regional headquarters and control centre for the Royal Observer Corps's No. 20 Group YORK between 1961 and 1991. It has become an English Heritage Scheduled Monument and was opened in 2006 by English Heritage as a tourist attraction.

During its Cold War operational period, the building could have supported 60 local volunteer members of the Royal Observer Corps, inclusive of a ten-man United Kingdom Warning and Monitoring Organisation scientific warning team. They would have collated details of nuclear bombs exploded within the UK and tracked radioactive fallout across the Yorkshire region, warning the public of its approach. This example of an ROC control building is the only one that is preserved in its operational condition. The others stand derelict or have either been demolished or sold. A few have been converted to other uses, like No. 16 Group Shrewsbury that is now a veterinary clinic, another is a recording studio, two are satellite and communications control centres, and one is a solicitor's file storage facility.

The fully restored building contains air filtration and generating plant, kitchen and canteen, dormitories, radio and landline communication equipment and specialist 1980s computers and a fully equipped operations room with vertical illuminated perspex maps.

References

External links

English Heritage York Bunker

Buildings and structures in York
Nuclear bunkers in the United Kingdom
English Heritage sites in North Yorkshire
Royal Observer Corps
1961 establishments in England
1991 disestablishments in England
Military history of North Yorkshire
Civil defense
Museums in York
Cold War museums in the United Kingdom
Military and war museums in England